Hoffman Island is an  artificial island in the Lower New York Bay, off the South Beach of Staten Island, New York City. A smaller,  artificial island, Swinburne Island, lies immediately to the south. Created in 1873 upon the Orchard Shoal by the addition of landfill, the island is named for former New York City mayor (1866–1868) and New York Governor (1869–1871) John Thompson Hoffman.

During the late 1800s and early 1900s, Hoffman (and Swinburne) Island was used as a quarantine station, housing immigrants who, upon their arrival at the immigrant inspection station at nearby Ellis Island, presented with symptoms of contagious disease(s).

World War II
Starting in 1938 and extending through World War II, the United States Merchant Marine used Hoffman and Swinburne Islands as a training station. The Quonset huts built during this period are no longer evident on Hoffman Island, but as of 2017 their remnants remain on Swinburne Island. During World War II the islands also served as anchorages for Antisubmarine Nets intended to protect New York Bay and its associated shipping/naval activities from enemy submarines entering from the Atlantic Ocean.

Post–World War II
Since World War II several proposals for utilizing Hoffman and Swinburne Islands have been presented. In the 1950s, city planner Robert Moses and political consultant Bernard Baruch advocated transforming the islands into a city park, but this plan was not realized. In 1961, all existing buildings on Hoffman Island were razed. In 1965 on Hoffman Island, eleven people, including the filmmaker Leon Gast, were arrested on charges including trespassing and indecent exposure for their roles in creating a Nudie film on the island.

In the 1980s, in response to plans of New York City to open new homeless shelters amidst Staten Island's residential neighborhoods, some of the potentially affected residents proposed a never-implemented plan to construct a homeless shelter on Hoffman Island, Swinburne Island or both.

Current use
Hoffman and Swinburne islands are currently managed by the National Park Service as part of the Staten Island Unit of Gateway National Recreation Area. To protect the islands' avian residents, which include great egret, snowy egret, black-crowned night heron, glossy ibis, double-crested cormorant and great black-backed gull, the island is off limits to the public. Beginning in 2001, harbor seals have been observed wintering on and near the islands.

References

Further reading
Seitz, Sharon & Miller, Stuart. (2003) The Other Islands of New York. .

External links 

 "A Little Island Near New York Peopled With Babies" - The New York Times, Magazine Section. November 27, 1910
 "First U. S. Maritime Service Training Station" - Mast Magazine, March 1944
 "...to the New York Islands" at Forgotten NY
NYC Audubon Harbor Herons Project
Harbor Herons Nesting Survey -recent reports on wading bird, cormorant, and gull nesting activity at Hoffman Island
 NYC Audubon's Harbor Herons Project
 Hoffman Island Radio Association

Islands of New York City
Artificial islands of New York (state)
History of immigration to the United States
History of New York City
Protected areas of Staten Island
Islands of Staten Island
Gateway National Recreation Area
Nature reserves in New York (state)
Islands of New York (state)
1873 establishments in New York (state)
Military facilities in New York City